The New Commonwealth was an international organisation created in London in 1932 with branches in France and Germany. It advocated pacifism, disarmament and multilateral resolution of conflicts through political lobbying and different publications.

Aims 
The New Commonwealth Society was created in October 1932 in London, with the former Labour member of parliament George Barnes as its first President, and with Henry de Jouvenel of France, Ernst Jäckh of Germany, and the American Oscar T. Crosby as vice-presidents. It advocated the creation of an international tribunal and an international police force.

Later, the Society defended the creation of an international air force which would act as a military arm of the League of Nations, promoting disarmament and keeping the world's peace. Those promoting the New Commonwealth included the millionaire David Davies, 1st Baron Davies, who became its chairman, others who had taken part in building up the League of Nations Union, and Winston Churchill, who was elected as the organization's president. Ernst Jaeckh was appointed as international director.

In a speech to the Society in May 1937, Churchill said 

Some of the ideas of the New Commonwealth Society were later incorporated into the United Nations Charter.

Publications 
To promote its aims, the Society published a monthly, The New Commonwealth, from 1932 to 1950. It also published a quarterly from 1935 to 1943, first named New Commonwealth Quarterly, later renamed the London Quarterly of World Affairs. Otto Neurath was a member of the editorial committee. 

The Society also published many pamphlets and books.

Notes

Bibliography
Christoph Johannes Ploß, Die "New Commonwealth Society" (Stuttgart: Franz Steiner Verlag, 2017) 

Organizations established in 1932
Peace organisations based in the United Kingdom
Arms control